Patrick Ohlstrom (16 December 1890 – 10 June 1940) was an Australian cricketer. He played in one first-class match for South Australia in 1923/24.

See also
 List of South Australian representative cricketers

References

External links
 

1890 births
1940 deaths
Australian cricketers
South Australia cricketers
Cricketers from Adelaide